Maevatanana is a rural municipality in northern Madagascar, in the district of  Ambanja.

References

Populated places in Diana Region